Biblical Aramaic is the form of Aramaic that is used in the books of Daniel and Ezra in the Hebrew Bible. It should not be confused with the Targums – Aramaic paraphrases, explanations and expansions of the Hebrew scriptures.

History
During the Babylonian captivity of the Jews, which began around 600 BCE, the language spoken by the Jews started to change from Hebrew to Aramaic, and Aramaic square script replaced the Paleo-Hebrew alphabet. After the Achaemenid Empire annexed the Neo-Babylonian Empire in 539 BCE, Aramaic became the main language of public life and administration. Darius the Great declared Imperial Aramaic to be the official language of the western half of his empire in 500 BCE, and it is that Imperial Aramaic that forms the basis of Biblical Aramaic.

Biblical Hebrew was gradually reduced to the status of a liturgical language and a language of theological learning, and the Jews of the Second Temple period that started in 516 BCE would have spoken a western form of Old Aramaic until their partial Hellenization from the 3rd century BCE and the eventual emergence of Middle Aramaic in the 3rd century CE.

As Imperial Aramaic had served as a lingua franca throughout the Ancient Near East from the second half of the 8th century BCE to the end of the 4th century BCE, linguistic contact with even the oldest stages of Biblical Hebrew, the main language of the Hebrew Bible, is easily accounted for.

Biblical Aramaic's relative chronology has been debated mostly in the context of dating the Book of Daniel. In 1929, Harold Rowley argued that its origin must be later than the 6th century BCE and that the language was more similar to the targums than to the Imperial Aramaic documents available at his time.

Others have argued that the language most closely resembles the 5th-century BCE Elephantine papyri, and so is a good representative of typical Imperial Aramaic, including Jongtae Choi's doctoral dissertation at Trinity Evangelical Divinity School. Kenneth Kitchen takes an agnostic position and states that the Aramaic of the Book of Daniel is compatible with any period from the 5th to early 2nd century BCE.

Aramaic and Hebrew
Biblical Hebrew is the main language of the Hebrew Bible. Aramaic accounts for only about 250 verses out of a total of over 23,000. Biblical Aramaic is closely related to Hebrew, as both are in the Northwest Semitic language family. Some obvious similarities and differences are listed below:

Similarities
Hebrew and Aramaic have simplified the inflections of the noun, adjective and verb. These are more highly inflected in classical Arabic, Babylonian and Ugaritic.

Differences
 The definite article is a suffixed -ā (א) in Aramaic (an emphatic or determined state), but a prefixed h- (ה) in Hebrew.
 Aramaic is not a Canaanite language and so did not experience the Canaanite vowel shift from * ā to ō.
 In Aramaic, the preposition dalet functions as a conjunction and is often used instead of the construct to indicate the genitive/possessive relationship.

Sound changes

In the Hebrew Bible

Undisputed occurrences 
 Genesis 31:47translation of a Hebrew placename, Jegar-Sahadutha (Strong's #H3026)
 Proverbs 31:2 the Aramaic word bar is used instead of the usual Hebrew ben, both meaning "son"
 Jeremiah 10:11a single sentence denouncing idolatry occurs in the middle of a Hebrew text.
 Daniel 2:4b–7:28five stories about Daniel and his colleagues, and an apocalyptic vision.
 Ezra 4:8–6:18 and 7:12–26quotations of documents from the 5th century BCE on the restoration of the Temple in Jerusalem.

Other suggested occurrences
 Genesis 15:1the word במחזה (ba-maħaze, "in a vision"). According to the Zohar (I:88b), the word is Aramaic, as the usual Hebrew word would be  (ba-mar’e).
 Numbers 23:10the word רבע (rôḇa‘, usually translated as "stock" or "fourth part"). Joseph H. Hertz, in his commentary on this verse, cites Friedrich Delitzsch's claim (cited in William F. Albright' JBL 63 (1944), p. 213, n.28) that it is an Aramaic word meaning "dust".
 Job 36:2a ("כַּתַּר־ לִ֣י זְ֭עֵיר וַאֲחַוֶּ֑ךָּ")Rashi, in his commentary on the verse, states that the phrase is in Aramaic.
 Psalm 2:12the word בר (bar) is interpreted by some Christian sources (including the King James Version) to be the Aramaic word for "son" and renders the phrase נשקו-בר  (nashəqū-bar) as "kiss the Son," a reference to Jesus. See Psalm 2 for further discussion of the controversy.

Chaldean misnomer
For many centuries, from at least the time of Jerome of Stridon (d. 420), Biblical Aramaic was misnamed as "Chaldean" (Chaldaic, Chaldee). That label remained common in early Aramaic studies, and persisted up to the nineteenth century. The "Chaldean" misnomer was consequently abandoned, when further research showed conclusively that the Aramaic dialect used in the Hebrew Bible was not related to the ancient Chaldeans and their language.

See also
 Aramaic studies
 Biblical studies
 Israelian Hebrew
 Language of Jesus

References

Sources

 
 
 
 
 
 
 
 
 
 
 
 
 
 

Aramaic languages
Aramaic
Languages attested from the 5th century BC
Languages extinct in the 3rd century